Chalcosoma engganensis is a large (35–60 mm) and heavy beetle. The body is shiny black. The male has a sharp horn (directed obliquely upward and forward) on the head. On each side of pronotum there are curved, forward directed horns. Across the head there is a short but powerful spike. This species differs from the normally developed specimens of the other Chalcosoma species in that horns are shorter, male can look a lot like small copies of Chalcosoma moellenkampi. The female lacks these horns and spikes, and is smaller.

References 

Beetles of Asia
Dynastinae